Abhar and Khorramdarreh (electoral district) is the 2nd electoral district in the Zanjan Province of Iran.
It has a population of 234,342 and elects 1 member of parliament.

1980
MP in 1980 from the electorate of Abhar. (1st)
 Farajollah Vaezi

1984
MP in 1984 from the electorate of Abhar. (2nd)
 Hassan Mousavipour

1988
MP in 1988 from the electorate of Abhar. (3rd)
 Mostafa Morsali

1992
MP in 1992 from the electorate of Abhar. (4th)
 Fazel Amir-Jahani

1996
MP in 1996 from the electorate of Abhar. (5th)
 Ahmad Mahdavi Abhari

2000
MP in 2000 from the electorate of Abhar and Khorramdarreh. (6th)
 Fazel Amir-Jahani

2004
MP in 2004 from the electorate of Abhar and Khorramdarreh. (7th)
 Ahmad Mahdavi Abhari

2008
MP in 2008 from the electorate of Abhar and Khorramdarreh. (8th)
 Ahmad Mahdavi Abhari

2012
MP in 2012 from the electorate of Abhar and Khorramdarreh. (9th)
 Mohammad Reza Khanmohammadi

2016

Notes

References

Electoral districts of Zanjan Province
Abhar County
Khorramdarreh County
Deputies of Abhar and Khorramdarreh